This is a list of cars with non-standard door designs, sorted by door type. These car models use passenger door designs other than the standard design, which is hinged at the front edge of the door, and swings away from the car horizontally and towards the front of the car.

List of non-standard door designs 
The main types of non-standard door designs are:
 Butterfly butterfly doors move via hinges along the A-pillar, on an axis not aligned vertically or horizontally to the vehicle or ground. A special type of butterfly door is a single door at the front of the car with the steering wheel attached.
 Canopy roof, windshield, and sides are one unit that moves upward, forward, or sideways to provide access.
 Gullwing (also called "falcon-wing") hinged to the roof at the top horizontal edge of the door, and open upward on a horizontal axis. Gullwing doors with a second hinge between door and moving roof panel are called falcon wing doors.
 Scissors rotate vertically at a fixed hinge at the front of the door, and open by rotating on a horizontal axis, perpendicular to the vehicle's length. Scissor doors that also move outward while rotating are called dihedral synchro-helix actuation doors.
 Sliding mounted to or suspended from a track, and open by sliding horizontally alongside or into the vehicle sidewall, or open by sliding vertically into the vehicle sidewall or floor. Sliding doors that disappear into the floor horizontally are called rolling doors.
 Suicide hinged on the rear end of the door-frame, and open horizontally towards the rear.
 Swan  opens outward like either a conventional door or a suicide door, but on an axis slightly tilted from vertical, or via articulation in the hinge to angle upward for better ground clearance 
Some custom limousines have enlarged doors.

Scissor doors

Road-legal cars 

 Bugatti EB110
 LaFerrari Aperta (doors open up and outward at a slight angle)
 Giotti Victoria Ginko
 Gumpert Nathalie
 HTT Pléthore LC 750
 IFR Aspid
 Jimenez Novia (doors include part of the roof)
 Kepler Motion
 Lamborghini Aventador (doors open up and outward at a slight angle)
 Lamborghini Aventador J
 Lamborghini Centenario
 Lamborghini Countach
 Lamborghini Diablo
 Lamborghini Murciélago
 Lamborghini Reventón
 Lamborghini Veneno
 Lykan HyperSport
 Mitsuoka Orochi
 Montecarlo Rascasse (similar doors to the Lamborghini Aventador)
 MTX Tatra V8
 Renault Twizy
 Spyker C8 Aileron, Spyker C8 Double and Spyker C8 Laviolette
 Spyker C8 Aileron Spyder and Spyker C8 Spyder
 Spyker C12 Zagato
 Tata Pixel
 Toroidion 1MW
 Tushek T700
 Vaydor
 Vector M12
 Vector W8
 Xpeng P7 (limited edition)

Racing cars 

 Spyker C8 Laviolette GT2R and Spyker C8 Spider GT2R

Concept cars 

 Arrinera Hussarya
 Alfa Romeo Carabo
 Alfa Romeo Brera Concept
 Alfa Romeo Pandion large suicide-scissor front doors
 Aston Martin AMV10
 Audi RS7 Concept
 Bertone Barchetta large suicide-scissor front doors
 Bozca Zest
 Cadillac Cien
 Chery Ant
 Chevrolet Miray
 Chrysler Portofino front scissor doors, with rear suicide scissor doors
 Citroën C-Métisse front scissor doors, with rear scissor doors
 Citroën Survolt
 Citroën Zabrus
 Dodge ZEO concept (front scissor doors with suicide rear scissor doors)
 Dome Zero
 Ford Indigo large suicide-scissor front doors
 Giugiaro Ford Mustang
 Isuzu Como Concept
 Jaguar XJ220 Concept
 Kia Kue
 KTM E3W
 Land Rover Range Stormer
 Mazda Hakaze Concept
 Mercedes-Benz Aria Concept large conventional-scissor front doors, with large suicide-scissor rear doors
 Peugeot Quartz
 Peugeot Shine front scissor doors, with rear scissor doors
 Pininfarina Sintesi front scissor doors, with rear scissor doors
 Renault Alpine A110-50
 Renault Coupe Corbusier large suicide-scissor front doors
 Renault Laguna Coupe Concept
 Renault Zoom
 Spyker Silvestris V8
 Toyota Alessandro Volta
 Toyota Bionic+ large suicide-scissor front doors
 Toyota Concept-愛i front scissor doors with rear suicide scissor doors
 Vector WX-3
 Volkswagen W12 Nardó
 Volkswagen W12 Roadster 
 Volkswagen W12 Syncró
 Zender Fact 4

Butterfly doors

Road-legal cars 

 Alfa Romeo 33 Stradale
 BMW i8
 Devon GTX
 Donkervoort D8 GT
 Felino CB7
 Enzo Ferrari
 LaFerrari
 Ford GT (2nd generation)
 Gillet Vertigo
 GTA Spano (2nd generation only)
 Heinkel Kabine
 Joss JP1
 Joss JT1
 Isetta
 Laraki Fulgara
 Lotec Sirius
 Manta Montage
 Marussia B1
 Maserati MC20
 McLaren 12C Doors are not hinged at the roof, unlike most butterfly door designs.
 McLaren 12C Spider similar doors to McLaren 12C
 McLaren 540C, McLaren 570GT and McLaren 570S
 McLaren 625C, McLaren 650S and McLaren 675LT
 McLaren 625C Spider and McLaren 650S Spider
 McLaren 720S
 McLaren 765LT
 McLaren F1 and McLaren F1 LM
 McLaren M6GT
 McLaren P1
 McLaren Senna
 McLaren Speedtail
 Mercedes-AMG Project One
 Mercedes-Benz CLK GTR (Street Version)
 Mercedes-Benz CLK GTR Roadster
 Mercedes-Benz SLR McLaren
 Mercedes-Benz SLR McLaren Roadster
 Mercedes-Benz SLR McLaren Stirling Moss
 Mosler MT900
 Pagani Utopia
 Panoz Esperante GTR-1
 Porsche 911 GT1 Straßenversion
 Porsche 928 Strosek Ultra Wing
 Saleen S7 and Saleen S7 Twin Turbo
 Savage Rivale Roadyacht GTS conventional-butterfly front doors, with suicide-butterfly rear doors
 SIN R1
 SSC Aero
 SSC Tuatara
 SSC Ultimate Aero and SSC Ultimate Aero XT
 Stealth B6
 Toyota Sera
 Ultima Evolution
 Ultima GTR
 Ultima Mk. 3
 Ultima Sports
 Volkswagen XL1

Racing cars 
A common door design on Group C, IMSA GTP cars of the 1980s and early 1990s and recently on Daytona Prototype and Le Mans Prototype cars, this list does not include cars categorized as such. This list only includes purpose built race cars.

 Alfa Romeo 33/2
 Alfa Romeo Tipo 33
 Audi R18
 Chevron B70
 Ferrari 330P3, Ferrari 330P4 and Ferrari 412P
 Ferrari 512 S/M
 Ferrari FXX and Ferrari FXX Evoluzione
 Ferrari FXX-K
 Lola T70 Mk3B
 Mazda RX-500
 Mercedes-Benz CLK GTR
 Porsche 911 GT1
 Renault Mégane R.S. Trophy

Concept cars 

 Alfa Romeo Diva
 Audi Avus quattro
 Audi Nanuk similar doors to the McLaren 12C, with panels extend from the top to the roof (similar to the Ford GT40)
 Bertone Mantide
 BMW i8 Concept
 BMW Vision EfficientDynamics a concept electric car based on the production BMW i8 with butterfly doors
 Cadillac Urban Luxury Concept
 Citroën C-Métisse – front butterfly doors, with rear suicide scissor doors
 Citroën GT
 Citroën Karin
 Ferrari P4/5 by Pininfarina
 Geely Tiger GT
 Great Wall Haval E
 HU-GO
 Hyundai HND-9
 Infiniti Concept Vision Gran Turismo
 Isuzu XU-1
 Italdesign Giugiaro Parcour
 Italdesign GTZERO
 Kia Niro similar to butterfly doors, with panels extend from the roof to the top (similar to the Ford GT40)
 Lotus M250
 Mazda Furai
 Mazda Kiyora
 Mazda RX-500 – butterfly front doors with gull-wing doors over the engine compartment
 Mazda Taiki
 McLaren SLR Stirling Moss
 Mercedes-Benz Vision SLR
 Renault Altica
 Renault Captur Concept
 Renault DeZir conventional-butterfly door on driver's side, with suicide-butterfly door on passenger's side
 Renault Kwid concept
 Renault Zoe Z.E. front butterfly doors, with rear butterfly doors
 Saab PhoeniX
 SEAT Fórmula
 Scion Fuse
 Subaru VIZIV
 Stola Abarth Monotipo
 Toyota AXV-II
 Toyota Sportivo Coupe
 Venturi Volage
 Volkswagen Golf GTE Sport
 Volkswagen GTI Roadster Vision Gran Turismo

Gullwing doors

Road-legal cars 

 AMT Piranha
 Aston Martin Valkyrie (2018)
 Atla (automobile)
 Apollo IE
 Autozam AZ-1
 Bradley GTII
 Bricklin SV-1
 Bristol Fighter
 Dare DZ
 De Tomaso Mangusta (engine compartment)
 DMC DeLorean
 Eagle SS
 Embeesea Charger
 Fiberfab Aztec 7
 Foers Ibex
 GP Talon
 Gumpert Apollo 
 Gumpert Apollo Sport
 HiPhi X conventional front doors, with a pair of rear suicide doors and a pair of gull wing doors
 Hofstetter Turbo
 Innes Lee Scorpion K19
 Isdera Commendatore 112i
 Isdera Commendatore GT
 Isdera Imperator 108i
 Melkus RS 1000 
 Melkus RS 2000
 Mercedes-Benz 300SL
 Mercedes-Benz 300SLR Uhlenhaut Coupe
 Mercedes-Benz SLS AMG The SLS AMG is inspired from the 300SL
 Mercedes-Benz SLS AMG Electric Drive
 Mercedes-Benz SLS AMG GT and Mercedes-Benz SLS AMG GT Final Edition
 NSU Thurner RS
 Pagani Huayra
 Quant E
 Quant F
 Radical RXC originally only a racing car, but now road legal also
 Replicar Cursor
 RPB GT
 Siva S160 Spyder
 Suzuki Cara
 Tesla Model X conventional front doors, with rear falcon wing doors

Racing cars 

 Bill Thomas Cheetah
 Chaparral 2D
 Chaparral 2F
 Howmet TX
 Lola T70 3B
 Lola T70 Mk3
 Mercedes-Benz 300SLR
 Mercedes-Benz CLK LM
 Mercedes-Benz SLS AMG GT3
 Mercedes-Benz SLS AMG GT3 45th Anniversary
 Nimrod Aston Martin
 Nissan GT-R LM Nismo
 Opel Astra V8 Coupe DTM
 Opel Astra Xtreme a racing car based on the Opel Astra with front gullwing doors
 Peugeot 905
 Toyota GT-One

Concept cars 

 Alfa Romeo 33.2
 Asardo 1500 AR-S
 Aston Martin Bulldog
 Aston Martin Valkyrie
 Bertone Birusa
 Buick Riviera Concept
 BMW Turbo
 BMW Z9 gullwing door on driver's side, with conventional door on passenger's side
 Citroën Tubik
 Daewoo Mya
 Ferrari Sergio
 Ford Corrida
 Ford Cougar 406
 Ford Evos front gullwing doors, with rear gullwing doors
 Giugiaro Brivido
 Gumpert Tornante
 GM Ultralite
 Hyundai Nuvis
 Infiniti Triant
 Isdera Commendatore 112i
 Italdesign Giugiaro Clipper front butterfly doors, with rear gullwing doors
 Jiotto Caspita
 Kia KV7 conventional front doors, with rear gullwing doors
 Koenigsegg Quant
 Lamborghini Marzal
 Lincoln Navigator Concept
 Matra Laser
 Mazel Identity i1
 Mazda HR-X
 Mazda Ryuga
 Mazda RX-500 butterfly front doors, with gullwing doors over the engine compartment
 Mercedes-Benz AMG Vision Gran Turismo
 Mercedes-Benz C111
 Mercedes-Benz C112
 Mercedes-Benz F125
 Nissan Mixim
 Nissan NX-21 Concept
 Opel ECO Speedster
 Opel Monza
 Renault Mégane Coupe a concept car based on the Renault Mégane with gullwing doors
 Renault Nepta
 Renault Talisman
 Rolls-Royce 101EX
 Subaru Hybrid Tourer
 Toyota Fine-X, Fine-T
 Toyota i-Road
 Toyota Concept-愛i Ride
 Ultima Mk1
 Vauxhall Monza
 Volvo C30 IPD SEMA
 Volvo Your Concept Car

Suicide doors 

Models of automobiles that featured suicide doors (i.e., doors hinged at the rear) include most full-sized extended-cab pickup trucks (rear doors only), and some vehicles categorised:

 AC Petite (1953–1958) (front door on 2-door saloons)
 Acura Precision Concept (2016) (rear door)
 Adler Typ 10 2.5 Litre
 Alfa Romeo 8C
 Alfa Romeo Gloria (2013) (rear door)
 Alfa Romeo Romeo 1 and 2
 Alta A200 (1968–1974) (front door)
 AMC Cavalier (1965) (rear door)
 Aston Martin Atom (1939/1944) (front door)
 Austin 7 (1922–1939) (front door on 2-door tourers, 2-door convertibles, 2-door saloons, 2-door coupes, and 3-door vans)
 Austin FX4 taxi (1958–1997) (rear door)
 Autobianchi Bianchina Trasformabile
 BAIC BJ100
 Bentley State Limousine
 BMW 331 (1949) (front door)
 BMW 502 4-door sedans (1954–1964) (rear door)
 BMW i3 (2013–present) (conventional front doors, with suicide half-rear doors)
 BMW i3 Concept (2011) (rear door)
 BMW Vision Future Luxury (2014) (rear door)
 Borgward Hansa 2400 (1952–1959) (Front and rear doors)
 Borgward Hansa 2400 Pullmanlimousine (1953–1959) (front door)
 Bugatti Type 46 (1929–1939) (front door)
 Bugatti Type 57 (1934–1940) (front door)
 Buick Roadmaster (rear door on 1st generation), (front door on 2nd generation)
 Cadillac Ciel (2011) (rear door)
 Cadillac Eldorado Brougham (1957–1958) (rear door)
 Cadillac LaSalle (1955) (rear door)
 Cadillac Series 65 (1937–1938) (rear door on 4-door sedans)
 Carbon Motors E7 police car (2008–2013) (rear door)
 Carbon Motors TX7 police SUV (2008–2013) (rear door)
 Chevrolet Biscayne (1955) (rear door)
 Chevrolet Greenbrier
 Chevrolet Master 2-door sedans (1935) (front door)
 Chevrolet Master Deluxe 2-door sedans (1935) (front door)
 Chrysler Airflow 4-door sedans (1934–1937) (rear door)
 Chrysler Akino (2005) (rear door)
 Chrysler Cirrus Concept (1992) (rear door)
 Chrysler Imperial Concept (2006) (rear door)
 Chrysler Royal (1933–1950) (rear door on 4-door sedans)
 Chrysler Windsor 4-door sedan (1946–1948) (rear door)
 Citroën 2CV (1948–1964) (front door)
 Citroën Activa (rear door)
 Citroën C3 Lumiere (1998) (rear door)
 Citroën C-SportLounge (2005) (rear door)
 Citroën C6 Lignage (1999) (rear door)
 Citroën H Van
 Citroën Hypnos (2008) (rear door)
 Citroën Metropolis (2010) (rear door)
 Citroën Revolte (2009) (conventional front doors, with suicide half-rear doors)
 Citroën Traction Avant (1934–1957) (front door on 4-door sedans, 2-door sedans, 2-door convertibles, and 5-door hatchbacks)
 Citroën Xanae (1994) (rear door)
 Dacia Duster Concept (2009) (rear door)
 Daihatsu Deca Deca (2009) (rear door)
 Daihatsu Deca Deca (2013) (conventional front doors, with suicide half-rear doors)
 Daihatsu FX (2015) (rear door)
 Daihatsu Hijet (1964–1968) (front door on vans and pickup trucks)
 Daihatsu Hinata (2015) (rear door)
 Dannenhauer & Stauss Cabriolet (1951–1957)(front door)
 Datsun Model 16 (1937–1938) (front door)
 Delahaye Type 135
 Denza EV (2012) (rear door)
 DKW 1000 S (1958–1961) (front door)
 DKW F7 (1937–1939) (front door on 2-door sedans, 2-door cabriolet sedans, and 2-door coupe cabriolets)
 DKW F8 (1939–1942) (front door on 2-door sedans, 2-door cabriolets, 2-door sedan deliveries, and 2-door flatbed trucks)
 Dodge Hornet (2006) (rear door)
 Dodge Super 8 Hemi (2001) (rear door)
 DS Divine (2014) (Butterfly front doors, with rear suicide doors)
 EMW 340 (1949–1955) (front door)
 Fiat 500 (1957–1965) (front door)
 Fiat 500 Spyder Bertone (1947) (front door)
 Fiat 508C (1937–1953) (rear door on 4-door sedans)
 Fiat 515 4-door sedans (1931–1935) (rear door)
 Fiat 518 Ardita 4-door sedans (1933–1938) (front door)
 Fiat 600 (1955–1969) (front door)
 Fiat 600 Multipla
 Fiat 1100 (1953–1969) (front door on 4-door sedans and 5-door estates)
 Fiat 1200 (1957–1961) (front door on 4-door sedans)
 Fiat AR 55 Campagnola
 Fiat Topolino (1936–1955) (front door)
 Fiat 500e "3+1" (single suicide half-rear door)
 Ford 021C (1999) (rear door)
 Ford 24.7 Wagon
 Ford F-150 SuperCab (1997–present) (conventional front doors, with suicide half-rear doors)
 Ford F-250 Super Chief
 Ford Iosis X (2006) (rear door)
 Ford Model U
 Ford Ranger SuperCab (2000–present) (conventional front doors, with suicide half-rear doors)
 Ford Thunderbird 4-door sedans (1967–1971) (rear door)
 Fuldamobil (1950–1969) (front door on 2-door coupes and 2-door convertibles)
 GMC Granite (2010) (rear door)
 Goggomobil 2-door sedans (1955) (front door)
 Hino 4CV (1953–1961) (front door on 4-door sedans and 4-door convertibles)
 Honda Element (2003–2011) (conventional front doors, with suicide half-rear doors)
 HiPhi X (2020–present) (rear door)
 Hongqi 77X (2015–present) (rear door)
 Hongqi CA 72
 Hongqi CA 770/772/773
 Hongqi CA 7650
 Hongqi HQE
 Hyundai Blue-Will (2009) (rear door)
 Hyundai Genesis HCD-14 (2013) (rear door)
 Hyundai Portico
 Hyundai Santa Cruz (2015) (conventional front doors, with suicide half-rear doors)
 Hyundai Prophecy Concept (2020) (conventional front doors, with suicide rear doors)
 Infiniti Etherea (2011) (rear door)
 Infiniti Kuraza (2005) (rear door)
 Infiniti Q80 Inspiration (2014) (rear door)
 Invacar
 Isuzu GBX (2001) (rear door)
 Italdesign Giugiaro Gea (2015) (rear door)
 JAC SC-9 (2014) (rear door)
 Jaguar B99 (2011) (rear door)
 Jaguar Mark IV (1935–1949) (Front suicide doors, with rear suicide doors)
 Jaguar R-D6 (2003) (conventional front doors, with suicide half-rear doors)
 Jowett Javelin (1947–1953) (front door on 4-door sedans)
 Kia Cross GT (2013) (rear door)
 Kia GT (2011) (rear door)
 Kia KND-7 (2013) (rear door)
 Kia Naimo (2012) (conventional front doors, with suicide half-rear doors)
 Kia Novo (2015) (rear door)
 Kia Optima Convertible Concept (2015) (rear door)
 Kia Ray PHEV (2010) (rear door)
 Kia Soul Concept (2008) (rear door)
 Kia Telluride (2016) (rear door)
 Kurogane Baby (1959–1961) (front door on vans and pickup trucks)
 Lagonda 3-Litre (1953–1958) (front door)
 Lancia Aprilia 4-door sedan (1937–1949) (rear door)
 Lancia Ardea 4-door sedan (1939–1953) (rear door)
 Lancia Aurelia 4-door sedan (1950–1958) (rear door)
 Lancia Dialogos (1998) (rear door)
 Lancia Florida I 4-door sedan (1955) (rear door)
 Land Rover Discovery Vision Concept (2014) (rear door)
 Lexus HPX (2003) (rear door)
 Lincoln C Concept (2009) (rear door)
 Lincoln Continental/Lincoln Continental police car (1961–1969)/(1961–1967)/(2019–2021) (rear door on 4-door sedans, 4-door convertibles and police cars)
 Lincoln Continental Concept (2002) (rear door)
 Lincoln MKS Concept (2006) (rear door)
 Lincoln Navicross (2003) (rear door)
 Lincoln-Zephyr (1936–1940) (rear door on 4-door sedans and 4-door convertible sedans)
 Lloyd 300
 Lloyd 400
 Lloyd LT 600 Van
 Maybach Zeppelin (1928–1938) (front door on 4-door sedans, 4-door convertibles, and 2-door convertibles)
 Mazda BT-50 Freestyle Cab (2002–present) (conventional front doors, with suicide half-rear doors)
 Mazda RX-8 Concept (2001) (conventional front doors, with suicide half-rear doors)
 Mazda RX-8 (2003–2011) (conventional front doors, with suicide half-rear doors)
 Mazda Secret Hideout (2001) (rear door)
 Mercedes-Benz 170
 Mercedes-Benz 220 (1951–1955) (front door on 4-door sedans, 2-door coupes, and 2-door cabriolet 'A's)
 Mercedes-Benz Vision GST (2002) (rear door)
 Mercedes-Benz F700 (2008) (rear door)
 Mercedes-Benz Vision G-Code (2014) (conventional front doors, with suicide half-rear doors)
 Mercury Eight 4-door sedan/Mercury Eight police car (1938–1951) (rear door)
 Mercury MC4 (1997) (conventional front doors, with suicide half-rear doors)
 MG Icon (2012) (conventional front doors, with suicide half-rear doors)
 MG TF and TF 1500 (1953–1955) (front door)
 Mini Clubman (2008–2015) (conventional front doors, with single suicide half-rear door)
 Mini Clubvan (2012) (conventional front doors, with single suicide half-rear door)
 Mitsubishi eX Concept (2015) (rear door)
 Mitsubishi Re-Model A (by West Coast Customs) (2017) (rear door)
 Morris Eight (1935–1948) (front door on 2-door sedans, 4-door sedans, 2-door convertibles, and tourers)
 Nash Ambassador (1927–1948) (rear door on 4-door sedans)
 Nissan Ellure (2010) (rear door)
 Nissan Gripz (2015) (Butterfly front doors, with suicide half-rear doors)
 Nissan Intima (2008) (rear door)
 Nissan Prince Royal (1966–1967) (rear door)
 Nissan Qashqai (2004) (rear door)
 Nissan Qazana (2009) (conventional front doors, with suicide half-rear doors)
 Nissan Sway (2015) (rear door)
 Nissan Titan Extended Cab (conventional front doors, with suicide half-rear doors)
 Nissan Townpod (2010) (conventional front doors, with suicide half-rear doors)
 Oldsmobile O4 (2001) (conventional front doors, with suicide half-rear doors)
 Oldsmobile Recon (1999) (rear door)
 Oldsmobile Series 60 (1938–1948) (rear door on 4-door sedans)
 Opel Admiral 4-door saloon/4-door cabriolet (1937–1939) (rear door)
 Opel Flextreme (2008) (rear door)
 Opel Flextreme GT/E (2010) (rear door)
 Opel Kapitän 4-door sedans (1938–1953) (rear door)
 Opel Meriva (2010–2017) (rear door)
 Opel Meriva Concept (2008) (rear door)
 Packard One-Ten (1938–1942) (rear door on 4-door sedans)
 Packard Super Eight (1939–1951) (rear door on 4-door sedans)
 Panhard Dyna Junior
 Panhard Dyna X
 Panhard Dyna Z
 Peel P50
 Peugeot 202 (1938–1942) (front door on 4-door sedans, 2-door cabriolets, and 2-door fourgonettes)
 Peugeot 203 (1948–1960) (front door on 4-door sedans, 5-door estates, 2-door cabriolets, 4-door cabriolets, and 2-door coupes)
 Peugeot 301 (1932–1936) (front door on 4-door sedans, 2-door coupes, 2-door cabriolets, and 3-door vans)
 Peugeot 302
 Peugeot 402
 Peugeot 601
 Peugeot BB1 (2009) (front door)
 Peugeot EX1 Concept (2010) (front door)
 Peugeot Fractal (2016) (front door)
 Peugeot SXC Concept (2011) (rear door)
 Peugeot VLV
 Pininfarina Cambiano (2012) (conventional front doors, with single suicide rear door)
 Pontiac Strato Streak (1954) (rear door)
 Porsche 928 Study H50 (1987) (conventional front doors, with suicide half-rear doors)
 Porsche Mission E (2015) (rear door)
 Praga Piccolo Furgon
 Proton e-Luma (2014) (conventional front doors, with suicide half-rear doors)
 Renault 4CV (1946–1961) (front door on 4-door sedans and 4-door convertibles)
 Renault Celtaquatre 4-door sedan/2-door coupe/2-door cabriolet (1934–1938) (front door)
 Renault Egeus (2005) (rear door)
 Renault Eolab (2014) (rear door)
 Renault Frendzy (2011) (conventional front doors, with single suicide door and single sliding door)
 Renault Initiale Paris (2013) (rear door)
 Renault Monaquatre 4-door sedan (1931–1936) (rear door)
 Renault R-Space (2011) (rear door)
 Renault Twin'Z (2013) (rear door)
 Renault Vivastella 4-door sedan (1934–1939) (front door)
 Riley RM (1945–1955) (front door on 4-door sedans and 2-door convertibles)
 Rolls-Royce Cullinan (2018–present) (rear door)
 Rolls-Royce 200EX (2009) (rear door)
 Rolls-Royce Dawn (2015–present) (front door)
 Rolls-Royce Ghost (2010–present) (rear door)
 Rolls-Royce Ghost EWB (2011–present) (rear door)
 Rolls-Royce Phantom (2003–2017) (rear door)
 Rolls-Royce Phantom (2018–present) (rear door)
 Rolls-Royce Phantom Coupe (2008–2017) (front door)
 Rolls-Royce Phantom Drophead Coupe (2007–2017) (front door)
 Rolls-Royce Phantom EWB (2005–2017) (rear door)
 Rolls-Royce Phantom I, II, III, IV, V and VI
 Rolls-Royce Silver Dawn (1949–1955) (front door on 4-door sedans)
 Rolls-Royce Silver Wraith (1946–1958) (rear door on 4-door sedans)
 Rolls-Royce Wraith (2013–present) (front door)
 Rover P3 4-door sedan (1948–1949) (Front suicide doors, with rear suicide doors)
 Rover P3 4-door sports sedan (1948–1949) (Front suicide doors, with rear suicide doors)
 Rover P4 (1949–1964) (rear door on 4-door sedans)
 Russo-Baltique Impression (2007) (front door)
 Saab 92 (1949–1956) (front door on 2-door coupes)
 Saab 93 (1956–1960) (front door on 2-door coupes)
 Saturn Flextreme (2008) (rear door)
 Saturn Ion Quad Coupe (2002–2007) (conventional front doors, with suicide half-rear doors)
 Saturn SC (1999–2002) (conventional front doors, with single suicide half-rear door)
 Scion t2B (2005) (conventional front doors, with suicide half-rear doors)
 SEAT 600 and SEAT 600 D (1957–1970) (front door on 2-door sedans)
 SEAT 800 (1963–1968) (front door on 4-door sedans)
 Simca 6 (1947–1950) (front door on 2-door coupes and 3-door vans)
 Simca 8 4-door sedan (1937–1951) (rear door)
 Singulato iS6 (2018–present)
 Singer Hunter (1954–1956) (rear door on 4-door sedans)
 Singer SM1500 (1948–1954) (rear door on 4-door sedans)
 Škoda Superb 4-door sedan (1934–1949) (front door)
 Škoda VOS 4-door sedan (1949–1952) (front door)
 Spyker D12 Peking-to-Paris (2006) (rear door)
 Studebaker Champion 4-door sedans (1947–1952) (rear door)
 Subaru 360 (1958–1971) (front door on 2-door sedans and 2-door convertibles)
 Subaru B11S (2003) (conventional front doors, with suicide half-rear doors)
 Subaru Sambar (1961–1966) (front door on vans and pickup trucks)
 Sunbeam-Talbot 90 (1948–1954) (rear door on 4-door sedans)
 Sunbeam-Talbot Ten 4-door sedan (1938–1948) (Front suicide doors, with rear suicide doors)
 Suzuki Mom's Personal Wagon (2005) (rear door)
 Suzulight FB/FBD (1961–1965) (front door on 3-/4-door vans and 2-door pickup trucks)
 Ssangyong XIV-1 (2011) (rear door)
 Tata Nexon (2014) (conventional front doors, with suicide half-rear doors)
 Tatra 57 2-door coupes (1932–1949) (front door)
 Tatra 600 (1947–1952) (front door)
 Toyota AA 4-door sedans (1936–1943) (rear door)
 Toyota A-BAT (2007) (conventional front doors, with suicide half-rear doors)
 Toyota Century Royal
 Toyota Crown (1955–1962) (rear door on 4-door sedans)
 Toyota FJ Cruiser (2006–2018) (conventional front doors, with suicide half-rear doors)
 Toyota FT-SX (2005) (rear door)
 Toyota Hybrid X (2007) (rear door)
 Toyota ME.WE (2013) (rear door)
 Toyota Origin (2000–2001) (rear door)
 Toyota Tacoma
 Triumph Renown (front doors)
 Vauxhall 10-4 4-door sedan/2-door coupe/2-door tourer/2-door roadster (1937–1940) (front door)
 Vauxhall Meriva (2010–2017) (rear door)
 Venucia VOW (2015) (rear door)
 Vespa 400 (1957–1961) (front door)
 Volkswagen Concept A (2006) (conventional front doors, with suicide half-rear doors)
 Volkswagen Nezza (2006) (rear door)
 Volkswagen Transporter (T1) (1950–1967) (conventional front doors, with single conventional half-rear door and single suicide half-rear door)
 Volkswagen Type 147 Kleinlieferwagen (1964–1974) (front door on 2-door panel vans)
 Volvo Concept Universe (2011) (rear door)
 Volvo Concept You (2011) (rear door)
 Volvo PV 36 Carioca (1935–1938) (front door on 4-door sedans)
 Volvo Venus Bilo (1933) (rear door)
 W Motors Fenyr SuperSport (2017–present) (front suicide swan doors)
 W Motors Lykan HyperSport (2013–2017) (front suicide swan doors)
 Wanderer W22
 Wanderer W24
 Zastava 750 (1955–1969) (front door)
 ZAZ-965 Zaporozhets (1960–1969) (front door)

Canopy doors 

 AMC Amitron Concept (side and windows with roof pivot back on counterbalanced hinges, clamshell-style)
 Audi Avatar Concept
 Audi Urban Concept (rearward sliding canopy)
 Ed Roth's Beatnik Bandit "kustom" show car
 Bond Bug
 Bugatti Aerolithe
 Buick Wildcat Concept
 Chevrolet Express (concept car)
 Chevrolet Testudo (canopy-hinged at the front)
 Chrysler Turboflite (glass canopy, hinge on rear)
 Citroën Osée
 Daihatsu UFE-III
 Dodge Charger III
 Ferrari Modulo
 Fiat Abarth 2000 Scorpione (Pininfarina concept)
 FMR Tg500 (aircraft-style canopy, hinge on right side)
 General Motors EN-V (suicide-canopy, hinge on rear)
 Holden Hurricane
 Ikenga GT concept
 Isetta
 Isuzu COA
 Italdesign Quaranta
 KTM X-Bow GTX
 Lamborghini Egoista
 Lamborghini Terzo Millennio
 Lancia Stratos Zero concept car 
 Lincoln Futura (glass roof canopy hinged at the rear)
 Loremo (large bottom-hinged front canopy)
 Maserati Birdcage 75th extended canopy door, front 2/3 of the top of the car lifts up and moves forward
 Messerschmitt Kabinenroller (aircraft-style canopy, hinge on right side)
 Messerschmitt KR175 and Messerschmitt KR200 (aircraft-style canopy, hinge on right side)
 Murray T25 and Murray T27
 Nissan 126X
 Nova (kit car) (Sterling Nova)
 Opel CD
 Opel RAK e
 Paulin VR
 Peel Trident (flip-top door that opens like a canopy)
 Renault Ondelios
 Renault Racoon
 Renault Trezor
 Saab Aero-X (canopy lifts upward and forward, sides move outward and forward)
 Smyk Single front-mounted door was hinged at the bottom.
 Suzuki Pixy + SSC The SSC has its doors hinged at both the front and rear of the car, but the Pixy has a glass roof canopy hinged at the rear.
 Syrma IED (rear-hinged canopy)
 Toyota i-Unit (glass roof canopy hinged at the rear)
 Toyota EX-7 (rear-hinged canopy similar to Syrma IED)
 Toyota Publica Sports (rearward sliding canopy)
 Tramontana (sports car)
 Volkswagen L1
 Volkswagen Nils
 Yamaha OX99-11
 Zagato Raptor

Swan doors 

Swan doors open outward like either a conventional door or a suicide door, but hinge slightly upward as well for better ground clearance, includes some vehicles categorised:

 Alfa Romeo Disco Volante
 Aston Martin CC100 Speedster
 Aston Martin DB9
 Aston Martin DB10
 Aston Martin DBS V12
 Aston Martin DBX
 Aston Martin DP-100
 Aston Martin Lagonda SUV
 Aston Martin One-77
 Aston Martin Rapide
 Aston Martin Rapide S
 Aston Martin Rapide Jet
 Aston Martin Rapide Bertone Jet 2+2
 Aston Martin V8 Vantage
 Aston Martin Vantage
 Aston Martin Vanquish
 Aston Martin Virage
 Aston Martin Vulcan
 Audi RSQ Suicide-swan front doors
 Bentley EXP 10 Speed 6 Concept
 Bentley EXP 12 Speed 6e Concept
 Bertone Nuccio
 Chevrolet Corvette Stingray
 GTA Spano (first generation only)
 Hennessey Venom GT
 Honda HSC
 Hyundai i-Oniq
 Jaguar C-X75
 Kia Pop
 Lagonda Taraf
 Lamborghini Asterion
 Lumeneo SMERA
 Lotus M250
 Lykan HyperSport suicide-swan front doors
 Marussia B2
 Mazzanti Evantra suicide-swan front doors similar to the Lykan HyperSport with panels extend to the roof from the top (similar to the Ford GT40)
 Mercedes-Benz F400 Carving
 Nissan Blade Glider
 Nissan Urge
 Peugeot HX1 Concept conventional-swan front doors, with suicide-swan rear doors
 Smart Forjeremy a city car based on the Smart Fortwo with swan doors
 Toyota FT-1
 Toyota NS4
 Vencer Sarthe
 Volvo 3CC

Dihedral synchro-helix actuation doors 

Dihedral doors are a type of doors found on all Koenigsegg cars. They open by rotating 90° at the hinge.
 Koenigsegg Agera
 Koenigsegg Agera Final
 Koenigsegg Agera R
 Koenigsegg Agera RS
 Koenigsegg CC
 Koenigsegg CC8S
 Koenigsegg CCR
 Koenigsegg CCX
 Koenigsegg CCXR
 Koenigsegg Jesko
 Koenigsegg One:1
 Koenigsegg Regera
 Koenigsegg Trevita 
 Koenigsegg Gemera
 Koenigsegg CC850

Other door types 
  

 AMC Pacer  Aircraft-style doors improve sealing and reduce wind noise, top of door wraps into the roof, hinges provide an outward arc for the top of the door for easier egress when open, rain gutters are hidden in the roof cut outs, the passenger door is four-inches (101 mm) longer than the driver's and the difference disguised by the broad B-pillar design.
 BMW 600  left-side-mounted front door
 Chrysler ME Four-Twelve  conventional front doors, but no door handles
 Ford GT (first generation), Ford GT40 and Ford GT90  conventional front-hinged doors that have panels extended to the roof of the car (also called aircraft doors)
 Hudson Italia  doors cut  into the roof (also called aircraft doors)
 Hyundai Veloster  Driver side of the car has one coupe-sized door, but the passenger side has two smaller, sedan-sized doors for front and rear occupants.
 Lincoln Mark VIII Concept  Doors "rolled" into underbody of frame (also called disappearing doors)
 Mitsuoka MC-1  Plastic doors that can be removed when opened.
 Mohs SafariKar  doors slide outward from the body on four linear rods mounted behind the front row of seats providing egress from both the front and rear of the car when opened.
 Peel Manxcar  suicide rear-hinged doors that open until it touches the body of the car
 Smart Crossblade  minimal "sword-like" door
 Suzuki CV1  one single door in the car's fiberglass body
 Tata Magic Iris  All three doors are conventional doors, 2 doors on the passenger's side and 1 door on the driver's side.
 TVR Tuscan Speed Six  Conventional front doors, but door handles are in button form under the side mirrors.
 Zündapp Janus  front- and rear-mounted side-hinged doors
 HiPhi X Apart from the suicide doors, there is an extra pair of gullwing-like doors between the C and D pillars which the company marketed as the NT (New-type) doors.

Sliding doors 

Sliding doors are common on minivans, leisure activity vehicles, light commercial vehicles and minibuses. A few passenger cars have notably also been equipped with sliding doors, such as the Peugeot 1007, the Suzuki Alto Slide Slim, the BMW Z1 and the 1954 Kaiser Darrin. Many concept cars use the design as well.

Concept cars 

 Bertone Ramarro – forward sliding doors
 Chrysler Portal – front doors slide forward, rear doors slide rearward
 Honda Vision XS-1 – a single sliding door on each side for both the front and rear seats
 Lincoln Mark VIII – rolling door concept–doors slid downwards and disappeared into the bodywork
 Renault Scenic Concept – front doors slide forward, rear doors slide rearward
 Toyota Fine-Comfort Ride Concept – rear doors
 Toyota Kikai Concept
 Volkswagen BUDD-e – rear doors
 Volkswagen ID. – rear doors
 Volkswagen ID. Buzz – rear doors
 Volkswagen ID. Crozz – rear doors

No doors 
Some cars – generally those of a very open design – have no doors at all.
 Adamastor P003RL
 Allard Clipper 
 Ariel Atom 
 BAC Mono
 Bond Minicar 
 Brütsch Mopetta
 Caterham 7
 Goggomobil Dart
 Lotus Mark VI
 Lotus Super 7
 KTM X-Bow
 Meyers Manx classic "dune buggy"
 Mini Moke
 Steyr-Puch Haflinger (convertible)
 Trabant Tramp
 Volkswagen Schwimmwagen
 Zenos E10

References 

Nonstandard
Lists of things considered unusual
Door,nonstamdard